The 2003 Rhode Island Rams football team was an American football team that represented the University of Rhode Island in the Atlantic 10 Conference during the 2003 NCAA Division I-AA football season. In their fourth season under head coach Tim Stowers, the Rams compiled a 4–8 record (3–6 against conference opponents) and tied for eighth place in the conference.

Schedule

References

Rhode Island
Rhode Island Rams football seasons
Rhode Island Rams football